Vicenç Guarner i Vivancos (1893–1981) held senior positions in the Republican Army during the Spanish Civil War.

References 

1893 births
1981 deaths
Spanish military personnel of the Spanish Civil War (Republican faction)